Pia Z is the sixth studio album by American singer-actress Pia Zadora, released in October 18, 1989 by CBS Records and produced by Narada Michael Walden.
"Heartbeat of Love" was released as a single and included club mixes by Clivilles & Cole of C + C Music Factory fame. "If You Were Mine" was issued as a promotional single only, and included "I Wanna Be Your Woman" as the second track.

Track listing
All tracks composed by Liz Jackson and Narada Michael Walden; except where indicated  
 "Heartbeat of Love" 
 "I Wanna Be Your Woman" (Sally Jo Dakota, Narada Michael Walden)
 "Keep Me Inside Your Love" 
"You Made Me Want You" 
"Slam It" (Gigi Gonaway, Kevin Walden, Narada Michael Walden)
 "Eternally" (Jeffrey Cohen, Narada Michael Walden)
"If You Were Mine"
"I Am What I Am"
"Floating Hearts" (Corrado Rustici, Jeffrey Cohen, Narada Michael Walden)
"Kady" (Pia Zadora, Liz Jackson, Narada Michael Walden)

References

1989 albums
Pia Zadora albums
CBS Records albums
Albums produced by Narada Michael Walden